These are the albums that reached number one on the Billboard Dance/Electronic Albums chart in 2008.

Chart history

References

2008 in American music
United States Electronic Albums
2008